The Gibraltar national football team represents the Gibraltar in association football and is controlled by the Gibraltar Football Association (GFA), the governing body of the sport there. It competes as a member of the Union of European Football Associations (UEFA), which encompasses the countries of Europe. Organised football has been played in the country since the 19th century. Gibraltar first applied for UEFA membership in 1997 but was rejected because of intense opposition from Spain. In October 2012, Gibraltar reapplied for full membership and it was granted in March 2013. On 13 May 2016 Gibraltar was accepted as a member of the International Federation of Association Football (FIFA); this was after their original application in 2014 was denied.

The list encompasses the unofficial matches played by the team since 1993. There are three types of unofficial matches: any match that was played by the senior Gibraltar national team before joining UEFA in 2013, any match played by the development team (such as the team representing Gibraltar in the Men's Football at the 2015 Island Games) or any friendly match played against a club team. The team's largest unofficial victory came on 29 June 2003 when they defeated Sark by nineteen goals to nil. Their worst loss is 5–0 against Greenland in 1993.

Unofficial matches

All-time record of unofficial matches

Record by opponent

Record by competition

See also
 Gibraltar national football team results

Notes

References

External links
 

Gibraltar national football team results
Lists of national association football team unofficial results